Flying Platform may refer to:
De Lackner HZ-1 Aerocycle
Hiller VZ-1 Pawnee
Williams X-Jet